Walter Birch (27 June 1898 – 18 December 1965) was a British bobsledder. He competed in the four-man event at the 1928 Winter Olympics.

References

External links
 

1898 births
1965 deaths
British male bobsledders
Olympic bobsledders of Great Britain
Bobsledders at the 1928 Winter Olympics
Place of birth missing